Peru competed at the 1972 Summer Olympics in Munich, West Germany. 20 competitors, 17 men and 3 women, took part in 25 events in 7 sports.

Athletics

Track Events

Men

Women

Field Events

Women's pentathlon

Boxing

Cycling

Road
Team 

Individual

Fencing

One fencer represented Peru in 1972. The tournament was played by pools where everyone faced everyone on the group and the top fencers moved on to the next round.

Shooting

Two shooters, one man and one woman, represented Peru in 1972.

50 m rifle, prone
 Gladys Baldwin

Trap
 Juan Jorge Giha Sr.

Swimming

Men

Wrestling

References

External links
Official Olympic Reports

Nations at the 1972 Summer Olympics
1972 Summer Olympics
1972 in Peruvian sport